Critical Review: A Journal of Politics and Society is a quarterly academic journal covering political science that is published by Routledge for the Critical Review Foundation. It publishes papers on political theory, public opinion, and political economy. It was established in 1986 by editor-in-chief Jeffrey Friedman, who works with authors in "an aggressive, often substantive editing process" but also gives authors the option of double-blind peer review.

According to the Journal Citation Reports, the journal has a 2017 impact factor of 1.091.

References

External links
 

Political science journals
Classical liberalism
Taylor & Francis academic journals
Quarterly journals
Publications established in 1990
English-language journals